The 1989–90 Segunda División was the 41st season of the Mexican Segunda División. The season started on 18 August 1989 and concluded on 3 June 1990. It was won by León.

Changes 
 Potros Neza won the promotion to Primera División. However, because the club was the Atlante reserves team, the spot in the Division was bought by Veracruz.
 Atlético Potosino was relegated from Primera División.
 Bachilleres and Galicia were promoted from Segunda División B.
 Ayense was promoted from Tercera División.
 Tapatío, Pioneros Cancún and FEG were relegated from Segunda División.
 Orizaba franchise was bought by new owners, the team was relocated at Tijuana and renamed as Inter de Tijuana.

During the season
 Before Week 18, Nuevo León was sold, the new owners relocated the team in Saltillo and renamed it as Leones de Saltillo.

Teams

Group stage

Group 1

Group 2

Group 3

Group 4

Results

Final stage

Group 1

Group 2

Final

References 

1989–90 in Mexican football
Segunda División de México seasons